Clemenceau is a Brussels Metro station on the southern segment of lines 2 and 6. It is located on the /, close to the /, in the municipality of Anderlecht, in the western part of Brussels, Belgium.

The station opened on 18 June 1993 and was the terminus of line 2 until Delacroix opened in 2006. It is named after the nearby avenue, itself named after Georges Clemenceau, a former Prime Minister of France.

External links

 Station ID - Clemenceau, bsubway.net

Brussels metro stations
Railway stations opened in 1993
Anderlecht